May Toe Khine is a Burmese actress and a fashion and commercial model.

She gained widespread popularity after starring in Yuu Aung Chit Mae Lu (2019). Her portrayal of the character Akhayar earned praised by fans for her acting performance and character interpretation, and experienced a surgence of popularity.

Acting career and popularity 

May starred in the documentary series Mythical Myanmar Bagan, alongside Naw Phaw Eh Htar. The documentary is travel across exotic ancient city of Myanmar, Bagan to discover culture, heritage and beauty.

2018–present: Acting debut and rising popularity

She made her acting debut in the Yuu Aung Chit Mae Lu , alongside the top tier award-winning actor and actress, Eaindra Kyaw Zin and Nay Toe.  Her portrayal of the character Akhayar earned praised by fans for her acting performance and character interpretation, and experienced a resurgence of popularity.

Filmography

Film (Big Screen Movies)

Yuu Aung Chit Mae Lu (2019)

Short Film and Series

Mythical Myanmar Bagan  (2018)
Kalay A Tharr Kharr Thi  (2019)
Chit Say (2022)

Political activities

Following the 2021 Myanmar coup d'état, she participated in the anti-coup movement both in person at rallies and through social media. Denouncing the military coup, she took part in protests, starting in February. She joined the "We Want Justice" three-finger salute movement. The movement was launched on social media, and many celebrities have joined the movement.

On 2 April 2021, warrants for her arrest were issued under Section 505 (a) of the penal code by the State Administration Council for speaking out against the military coup. Along with several other celebrities, she was charged with calling for participation in the Civil Disobedience Movement (CDM) and damaging the state's ability to govern, with supporting the Committee Representing Pyidaungsu Hluttaw, and with generally inciting the people to disturb the peace and stability of the nation.

She has been arrested by the Terrorists on 13 April 2021. Her aunt, Eaindra Kyaw Zin and her uncle Pyay Ti Oo, were also arrested at their home on 9 April 2021. She was released on the evening of June 30, 2021.

References

1995 births
Living people
Burmese film actresses
Burmese female models
21st-century Burmese actresses
People from Yangon